David Farfan (born 10 May 1936, died before May 2009) was a Trinidad and Tobago sailor. He competed in the Flying Dutchman event at the 1972 Summer Olympics.

References

External links
 

1936 births
Year of death missing
Trinidad and Tobago male sailors (sport)
Olympic sailors of Trinidad and Tobago
Sailors at the 1972 Summer Olympics – Flying Dutchman
Place of birth missing